Yaroslav Nikolaevich Boyko (born May 14, 1970, Kyiv, Ukrainian SSR, USSR) is a Russian actor of theater and cinema.

Selected filmography
 Heads and Tails (1995) as driver
 Country of the Deaf (1998)  as bandit
In August of 1944 (2001) as captain Anikushin
Filipp's Bay (2006) as Oswald
 Anna Karenina (2009) as Count   Vronsky
 Sherlock Holmes (2013) as Vicki,  American ambassador

References

External links
 

1970 births
Living people
Russian male film actors
Russian male stage actors
Russian male television actors
Kyiv National I. K. Karpenko-Kary Theatre, Cinema and Television University alumni
Moscow Art Theatre School alumni
Russian people of Ukrainian descent
Actors from Kyiv